Youcef Ghazli (born July 29, July in London, England) is an Algerian footballer striker. He currently plays for CR Belouizdad in the Algerian Ligue Professionnelle 1.

Honours
 Won the Algerian First Division once with CR Belouizdad in 2009
 Won the North African Super Cup once with CR Belouizdad in 2010
 Won the Algerian Cup once with CR Belouizdad in 2012

External links
Widad-Tlemcen.com Profile

1988 births
Living people
Algerian footballers
People from Sidi Bel Abbès Province
WA Tlemcen players
ES Sétif players
Algerian Ligue Professionnelle 1 players
Algeria A' international footballers
2011 African Nations Championship players
ASO Chlef players
Association football forwards
21st-century Algerian people